Petritsi is a former municipality in the Serres regional unit, Greece. Since the 2011 local government reform it is part of the municipality Sintiki, of which it is a municipal unit, with a population of 4,832 (2011). The municipal unit has an area of 253.075 km2. The seat of the municipality was in Neo Petritsi.

Transport

Rail Transport
The settlement is served by Petritsi railway station on the Thessaloniki-Alexandroupoli line, with daily services to Thessaloniki and Alexandroupolis.

External links
Information about Petritsi by the Municipality of Petritsi (Greek)

References

Populated places in Serres (regional unit)

bg:Синтика (дем)